Marion Jones Callister (June 6, 1921 – June 24, 1997) was an American attorney and jurist who served as a judge of the United States District Court for the District of Idaho.

Early life and education

Born in Moreland, Idaho, Callister graduated from Blackfoot High School in 1939. He in the United States Army during World War II, from 1944 to 1946. He received a Bachelor of Science in Law from the University of Utah in 1950 and a Juris Doctor from the S.J. Quinney College of Law at the University of Utah in 1951.

Career 
Callister returned to Idaho and was an assistant Bingham County attorney in Blackfoot from 1951 to 1952, and an Assistant U.S. Attorney from 1953 to 1957. He was in private practice in Boise from 1958 to 1969, was a state district judge from 1970 to 1975, and became the U.S. Attorney for Idaho

Federal judicial service
On July 19, 1976, Callister was nominated by President Gerald Ford to a seat on the U.S. District Court vacated by Judge J. Blaine Anderson. Callister was confirmed by the U.S. Senate on August 26, and received his commission on September 1, 1976. Callister served as Chief Judge from 1981 to 1988, and assumed  senior status at age 68 on June 6, 1989. He served in that capacity for eight years, until his death in 1997 in Boise.

Personal life

Callister was a member of the Church of Jesus Christ of Latter-day Saints. As a young man, he served as a missionary: he was later bishop of the Boise 3rd Ward, counselor in and then president of the Boise West Stake, and a regional representative  Callister is buried at Morris Hill Cemetery in Boise.

References

Sources
 
 

1921 births
1997 deaths
University of Utah alumni
S.J. Quinney College of Law alumni
Idaho state court judges
Judges of the United States District Court for the District of Idaho
United States district court judges appointed by Gerald Ford
20th-century American judges
United States Army soldiers
Idaho lawyers
People from Blackfoot, Idaho
United States Attorneys for the District of Idaho
Assistant United States Attorneys
Latter Day Saints from Idaho
United States Army personnel of World War II